Gihan Premachandra (born May 30, 1980) was a Sri Lankan cricketer who played for Antonians. He was born in Colombo.

Premachandra made a single first-class appearance for the side, during the 1999-2000 Premier Championship. Batting in the tailend, he scored 2 not out in the first innings, and 4 in the second innings, as teammates Buddhika Ekanayake and Chandana Samarasinghe were recorded as being absent ill in the second innings.

External links
Gihan Premachandra at Cricket Archive 

1980 births
Living people
Sri Lankan cricketers
Antonians Sports Club cricketers